Karim Bambo (born 13 May 1993) is an Egyptian professional footballer who plays as a midfielder for Egyptian Premier League club National Bank of Egypt.

Honours
Zamalek
Egypt Cup: 2018–19
Egyptian Super Cup: 2019–20
 CAF Super Cup: 2020

References

1995 births
Egyptian footballers
Living people
Association football midfielders
Al Ahly SC players
Ismaily SC players
Zamalek SC players
Egyptian Premier League players
People from Red Sea Governorate